Agbandaode  is a village in the Assoli Prefecture in the Kara Region  of north-eastern Togo.

References

External links
Satellite map at Maplandia.com

Populated places in Kara Region
Assoli Prefecture